Vladimir Zemlyakov (sometimes listed as Vladimir Semiyakov) is a Soviet sprint canoeist who competed in the late 1960s and early 1970s. He won two medals at the ICF Canoe Sprint World Championships with a silver (K-1 10000 m: 1966) and a bronze (K-4 10000 m: 1971).

References

Living people
Soviet male canoeists
Year of birth missing (living people)
Russian male canoeists
ICF Canoe Sprint World Championships medalists in kayak